The Cook The Thief His Wife & Her Lover is the twelfth album release by Michael Nyman and the ninth to feature the Michael Nyman Band.  It is the soundtrack to the eponymous film by Peter Greenaway.  The album includes the first commercially released recording of Memorial (Greenaway heard a radio recording of the original performance that has not been commercially released), and this is the only piece discussed in the liner notes, to the point that the lyric sheet for "Miserere" (based on Psalm 51), the song which Pup the kitchen boy sings, is misidentified "Memorial."  "Book Depository" is one of Nyman's many waltzes.

Composition 
Nyman does not here identify the origin of Memorial as a bass ground from Henry Purcell's King Arthur, but he does so elsewhere, including on After Extra Time.  The liner notes primarily note the 1985 Heysel Stadium disaster that occurred during the work's composition and became what the work was about and a discussion of the premiere of the work in a disused nuclear power plant in Yainville before Paul Richards's painting, The Kiss, and its ultimate "dismantling," preventing it from being used to commemorate the 1989 Hillsborough disaster.

There is some music in the film that is not included on the soundtrack album:  the love theme for Michael and Georgina, which is "Fish Beach" from Drowning by Numbers, the song ("Something Sometime Soon") performed as a show in the restaurant, and sung by singer and actress Flavia Brilli, or a doubly pulsed variation of Memorial that occurs about halfway through the film.  Edits of "Memorial" appear throughout the film, with the entire twelve-minute movement accompanying the final scene and end credits, but one variation is uniquely created for the film.

Track listing 
 "Memorial" – 12:07
 "Miserere Paraphrase" – 5:44
 "Book Depository" – 5:41
 "Coupling" – 5:17
 "Miserere" – 11:32

Personnel 

Memorial, "Book Depository," and "Coupling" performed by the Michael Nyman Band:
 Alexander Balanescu, violin
 Elisabeth Perry, violin
 Jonathan Carney, violin/viola
 Tony Hinnigan, cello
 Chris Laurence (misspelled "Lawrence"), double bass
 David Fuest, clarinet/bass clarinet
 John Harle, soprano/alto sax
 David Roach, alto sax
 Andrew Findon, tenor/baritone sax/flute
 Graham Ashton, trumpet
 David Stewart, trombone
 Michael Nyman, piano, conductor
 Sarah Leonard, soprano

"Miserere Paraphrase" performed by Alexander Balanescu (violin) and Michael Nyman (piano)

"Miserere" performed by London Voices, director Terry Edwards

 Paul Chapman: boy soprano
 Elisabeth Harrison
 Judith Rees
 Sue Anderson
 Sarah Leonard
 Lesley Reid
 Doreen Walker
 Gareth Roberts
 Terry Edwards
 Simon Davies
 Gordon Jones
 Geoffrey Shaw
 Produced by David Cunningham
 Recorded and Mixed at PRT Studios
 Engineer: Michael J. Dutton
 Assistant Engineer: Dillon Gallagher
 "Miserere" recorded at Marcus Studio
 Engineer: Tim Hunt
 Mixed at Lansdowne Studios
 Engineer: Michael J. Dutton
 Assistant Engineer: Marsten Bailey
 Representative to Michael Nyman: Tony Simons

References 

Michael Nyman soundtracks
Crime film soundtracks
1989 soundtrack albums
Virgin Records soundtracks
Caroline Records soundtracks
Albums with cover art by Dave McKean